In industrial production, spillage is the loss of production output due to production of a series of defective or unacceptable products which must be rejected. Spillage is an often costly event which occurs in manufacturing when a process degradation or failure occurs that is not immediately detected and corrected, and in which defective or reject product therefore continues to be produced for some extended period of time.

Spillage results in costs due to lost production volume, excessive scrap, delayed delivery of product, and wastage of human and capital equipment resources. Minimization of the occurrence and duration of manufacturing spillage requires that closed-loop control and associated process monitoring and metrology functions be integrated into critical steps of the overall manufacturing process. The extent to which process control is complete and metrology is high resolution so as to be comprehensive determines the extent to which spillages will be prevented.

Waste